Hongeo-hoe is a type of fermented fish dish from Korea's Jeolla province. Hongeo-hoe is made from skate and emits a very strong, characteristic ammonia-like odor that has been described as being "reminiscent of an outhouse".

Origin
Skates (hongeo) are cartilaginous fish that excrete uric acid through the skin, rather than by urinating as other animals do. As they ferment, ammonia is produced, which helps preserve the flesh and gives the fish its distinctive, powerful odor.

The natural preservative effect of the fermentation process on skate meat was noted by Korean fishermen as early as the 14th century, during the Goryeo dynasty, long before refrigeration was invented. It was found that skates were the only fish that could be transported over long distances or stored for extended periods without rotting, even in the absence of salt.

Production
Originally, the skates used in the production of hongeo-hoe were harvested locally from the waters around Heuksando, an island off the southwestern coast of Korea. In more recent years, a larger proportion has been made with less expensive imported fish, mainly from Chile, although skate from Heuksando still retains a reputation for superior quality.

Specific production techniques vary from shop to shop, influenced in part by the local climate. According to the traditional method, after the fish are cleaned and eviscerated, they would be stored either in compost (in cold regions) or in piles of straw (in warmer regions) and left to ferment. In the present day, due to concerns over food safety and product consistency, the use of refrigeration has become more common. Under one modern method, the fish undergo fermentation in a walk-in refrigerator for as much as 15 days at 2.5 °C, and then for approximately 15 more days at 1 °C.

After fermentation, the preserved skates are sliced into small pieces and packed into boxes for shipment.

Eating
Hongeo-hoe is typically presented to diners as small slabs, sashimi-style, without being subjected to cooking or further preparation. 

Jeolla natives claim that hongeo-hoe should be consumed plain. However, the dish is often eaten together with bossam and kimchi, a combination known as hongeo samhap. It may also be served with the Korean alcoholic beverage makgeolli, which could help diners cope with the pungency of the fermented dish.

See also

References

Korean cuisine
Fermented fish